Pennine may refer to:

 Pennines, a mountain range in England
 Pennine Alps, a mountain range in the western Alps
 Pennine Way, a National Trail in England and Scotland
 Pennine FM, an Independent Local Radio station in Huddersfield, West Yorkshire
 Rolls-Royce Pennine, a British 46-litre air-cooled sleeve valve engine with 24 cylinders arranged in an X formation